Agroar Carga Aérea was a cargo airline based in Portugal. Having originally been specialized on agricultural aviation, Agroar launched commercial airline business with cargo flights between Lisbon and Funchal, using a Boeing 737-300 jet aircraft, which was owned by Flyant.

Agroar also offered aviation-related services like the launching of paratroopers, firefighting, and sightseeing and event flights, as well as aircraft maintenance.

References

Defunct airlines of Portugal
Airlines established in 1992
Airlines disestablished in 2005
Defunct cargo airlines
Cargo airlines of Portugal
Portuguese companies established in 1992